Taba ng talangka, also known simply as aligi (o ), is a Filipino seafood paste derived from the roe and reddish or orange tomalley of river swimming crabs or Asian shore crabs (talangka).

Commercially sold variants of the condiment are sautéed in garlic, preserved in oil, and sold in glass jars. In parts of Pampanga and Bulacan, a preparation of the dish called burong taba ng talangka (fermented crab roe) consist of fresh river crabs stored covered in salt as a method of preservation. This variant is served during mealtime and is immediately consumed due to its perishability once removed from the salting container.

It can be served as an accompaniment to white rice, used as a condiment, or used as an ingredient in various seafood dishes. Most notably, it is used as an ingredient of a variant of sinangag (Filipino fried rice) known as inaliging sinangag.

See also
Bagoong
Surimi
Tomalley
List of crab dishes

References

Fermented foods
Philippine condiments
Philippine seafood dishes